Yassine Khalifi (born 9 August 2005) is a Moroccan footballer who currently plays as a midfielder for Union Touarga.

Club career
Khalifi started his career at the Mohammed VI Football Academy, where he featured in various competitions for the side, including the Alkass International Cup. His performances for the youth academy reportedly caught the eye of Spanish side Atlético Madrid. He moved to top-flight Botola side Union Touarga in September 2022. In the same month, he was named by English newspaper The Guardian as one of the best players born in 2005 worldwide.

International career
Khalifi was first called up to the Morocco under-17 side in 2020 for a game against Tunisia. This was followed up with another call-up in January 2021, for a training camp. The following year, he was called up by the under-18 side for the Mediterranean Games. He scored a penalty in a 1–1 draw with Spain to send his team through to the semi-finals. He followed this up with another penalty goal in a 2–1 loss to Italy in the semi-final match.

He was called up to the Moroccan under-20 side for the 2022 Arab Cup U-20, and scored in a 4–2 group stage win against Sudan. Later in the same year, he featured in friendly matches against Chile and England. He also featured in the 2022 UNAF U-20 Tournament as Morocco finished third.

Career statistics

Club

Notes

References

2005 births
Living people
Moroccan footballers
Morocco youth international footballers
Association football midfielders
Mohammed VI Football Academy players